Aleksei German may refer to:

 Aleksei Yuryevich German (1938–2013), Russian film director and screenwriter
 Aleksei Alekseivich German (born 1976), Russian film director and screenwriter, son of Aleksei Yuryevich German